Water Temple may refer to:
Sunol Water Temple
Pulgas Water Temple
Balinese Temple, some of which worship water deity.
Water Temple (Ocarina of Time), a dungeon in the video game The Legend of Zelda: Ocarina of Time
 A building by Tadao Ando